Roger Federer defeated Novak Djokovic in the final, 6–0, 7–6 (9–7) to win the men's singles tennis title at the 2012 Cincinnati Masters. It was his record fifth Cincinnati Masters title, and the first time that a player won an ATP Tour Masters 1000 event without having his serve broken or losing a set. Federer would repeat this accomplishment at the 2015 event. It was Djokovic's fourth runner-up finish at the tournament.

Andy Murray was the defending champion, but lost in the third round to Jérémy Chardy.

Seeds
The top eight seeds receive a bye into the second round.

Draw

Finals

Top half

Section 1

Section 2

Bottom half

Section 3

Section 4

Qualifying

Seeds

Qualifiers

Lucky losers
  Jérémy Chardy
  Alejandro Falla

Draw

First qualifier

Second qualifier

Third qualifier

Fourth qualifier

Fifth qualifier

Sixth qualifier

Seventh qualifier

References
Main Draw
Qualifying Draw

2012 ATP World Tour
Men's Singles